JDZ may refer to:
 Jingdezhen Luojia Airport, in Jiangxi, China
 Joint Development Zone, along the maritime Nigeria – São Tomé and Príncipe border
 Yugoslav State Railways (JDŽ)